This is a list of marae (Māori meeting grounds) in Nelson, New Zealand.

List of marae

See also
 Lists of marae in New Zealand
 List of marae in the Tasman District
 List of schools in Nelson, New Zealand

References

Nelson, New Zealand, List of marae in
Marae
Marae in Nelson, New Zealand, List of